This is a list of British television related events in 1930.

Events

Births
28 January – Roy Clarke, comedy writer
29 January – John Junkin, comedy actor and screenwriter (died 2006)
9 May – Joan Sims, actress (died 2001)
1 June – Edward Woodward, actor (died 2009)
4 June – Bill Treacher. actor (died 2022)
17 July – Ray Galton, comedy writer (died 2018)
25 August – Sean Connery, Scottish-born screen actor (died 2020)
28 August – Windsor Davies, comedy actor (died 2019)
24 September – Angelo Muscat, Maltese actor (died 1977)
19 October – Mavis Nicholson, Welsh presenter (died 2022)
28 October – Philip Saville, director (died 2016)
7 November – Peter Woods, journalist and newsreader (died 1995)
4 December – Ronnie Corbett, Scottish-born comedy performer (died 2016)
8 December – Stan Richards, actor (Emmerdale) (died 2005)

See also
 1930 in British music
 1930 in the United Kingdom
 List of British films of 1930

References